Fusolatirus is a genus of sea snails, marine gastropod mollusks in the subfamily Peristerniinae of the family Fasciolariidae, the spindle snails, the tulip snails and their allies.

Species
According to the World Register of Marine Species (WoRMS) the following species with accepted names are included within the genus Fusolatirus :
thumb|Fusolatirus suduiraudi
 Fusolatirus balicasagensis (Bozzetti, 1997)
 Fusolatirus brinkae (Lussi, 1996)
 Fusolatirus bruijnii (Tapparone Canefri, 1876)
 Fusolatirus coreanicus (Smith, 1879)
 Fusolatirus elsiae (Kilburn, 1975)
 Fusolatirus formosior (Melvill, 1891)
 Fusolatirus higoi Snyder & Callomon, 2005
 Fusolatirus kandai (Kuroda, 1950)
 Fusolatirus luteus Snyder & Bouchet, 2006
 Fusolatirus nana (Reeve, 1847)
 Fusolatirus pachyus Snyder & Bouchet, 2006
 Fusolatirus paetelianus (Küster & Kobelt, 1874)
 Fusolatirus pagodaeformis (Melvill, 1899)
 Fusolatirus pearsoni (Snyder, 2002)
 Fusolatirus rikae (Fraussen, 2003)
 Fusolatirus sarinae (Snyder, 2003)
 Fusolatirus suduirauti (Fraussen, 2003)
Species brought into synonymy
 Fusolatirus kurodai (Okutani & Sakurai, 1964): synonym of Granulifusus kurodai (Okutani & Sakurai, 1964)
 Fusolatirus kuroseanus Okutani, 1975: synonym of Okutanius kuroseanus (Okutani, 1975) (original combination)
 Fusolatirus nanus [sic] accepted as Fusolatirus nana (Reeve, 1847) (misspelling)

References

 Kuroda, T.; Habe, T.; Oyama, K. (1971). The sea shells of Sagami Bay. Maruzen Co., Tokyo. xix, 1-741 (Japanese text), 1-489 (English text), 1-51 (Index), pls 1-121

External links
 

 
Gastropod genera